Nightwish is a 1989 American science fiction horror film directed by Bruce R. Cook and produced by Andrew Keith Walley. The film starred Brian Thompson, Jack Starrett, Elizabeth Kaitan, Alisha Das and Clayton Rohner.

Cast
 Brian Thompson - Dean
 Jack Starrett - Professor
 Elizabeth Kaitan - Donna
 Alisha Das - Kim
 Clayton Rohner - Jack
 Robert Tessier - Stanley
 Tom Dugan - Wendall
 Gayle Vance - Fruit Stand Lady

Reception 
Rue Morgue reviewed the film in 2019, noting that "There are a number of beautiful green-lit dream sequences and séances in Nightwish that give off a Re-Animator vibe, which makes sense because the Art Director worked on both films."

References

External links
 
 

1989 films
1989 horror films
American horror films
1980s English-language films
1980s American films